The men's 100 metre butterfly event at the 2014 Commonwealth Games as part of the swimming programme took place on 27 and 28 July at the Tollcross International Swimming Centre in Glasgow, Scotland.

The medals were presented by Bruce Robertson, Vice-President of the Commonwealth Games Federation and Swimming at the 1974 Commonwealth Games – Men's 100 metre butterfly|1974 Commonwealth bronze medallist in this event and the quaichs were presented by Paul Bush, Director of Commonwealth Games Scotland and former Chief Executive Officer of Scottish Swimming.

Records
Prior to this competition, the existing world and Commonwealth Games records were as follows.

The following records were established during the competition:

Results

Heats

Semifinals

Final

References

External links

Men's 100 metre butterfly
Commonwealth Games